Dirrington Great Law is a hill in the Scottish Borders area of Scotland, in the former county of Berwickshire. It is an isolated hill to the south of the Lammermuir Plateau.

Geologically, the two Dirrington Laws comprise Carboniferous volcanic felsite (riebeckite), and may be the remains of a laccolith, a type of volcanic intrusion into the surrounding sedimentary rocks of the Old Red Sandstone.

The cairns are composed of stones excavated from the hilltop, rather than from loose stone gathered from the ground.

See also
List of places in the Scottish Borders

References

 Craw J H (1923a), 'Early types of burial in Berwickshire', Hist Berwickshire Natur Club, vol.24,2, page 190

Mountains and hills of the Scottish Borders
Marilyns of Scotland
Berwickshire